The 2000 World Outdoor Bowls Championship women's fours was held in Moama, Australia, from 8 to 25 March 2000.

The gold medal was won by Jan Khan, Patsy Jorgensen, Sharon Sims and Anne Lomas of New Zealand.

Section tables

Section A

Section B

Bronze medal match
 Australia bt  Jersey 33–10

Gold medal match
 New Zealand bt  Scotland 18–17

References

Wom
World
Bow